Dudley Farlin (September 2, 1777 – September 26, 1837) was an American businessman and politician who served one term as a U.S. Representative from New York from 1835 to 1837.

Biography 
Born in Norwich, Connecticut, Farlin moved to Dutchess County, New York, in early youth, and later to Warren County.
He engaged in the lumber and grain business.
Supervisor of the town of Warrensburg 1818–1820, 1827, and 1828.
Sheriff of Warren County in 1821, 1822, and again in 1828.
He served as member of the State assembly in 1824.

Congress 
Farlin was elected as a Jacksonian to the Twenty-fourth Congress (March 4, 1835 – March 3, 1837).

Later career and death 
He resumed his former business pursuits.

He died in Warrensburg, New York, on September 26, 1837.
He was interred in Warrensburg Cemetery.

References

1777 births
1837 deaths
Jacksonian members of the United States House of Representatives from New York (state)
19th-century American politicians
Politicians from Norwich, Connecticut
People from Warrensburg, New York
Members of the United States House of Representatives from New York (state)